Since 2013, total primary energy consumption in India has been the third highest in the world (see world energy consumption) after China (see energy in China) and United States (see energy in United States). India is the second-top coal consumer in the year 2017 after China. India ranks third in oil consumption with 22.1 crore (221 million) tons in 2017 after United States and China. India is net energy importer to meet nearly 47% of its total primary energy in 2019.

Overview

Coal

Coal and lignite production was 73.1 crore (731 million) tons in the financial year 2019-2020. India was the fourth top coal producer in 2017 with 294.2 Mtoe (7.8% global share). Nearly 80% of total electricity generated (utility and captive) in India is from coal and it is the main source of the nation's greenhouse gas emissions. 
 
According to Greenpeace the largest coal belt in India is at Jharia. Before coal mining Jharia had forests inhabited by tribes. In 1971 the coal mines were nationalised. Bharat Coking Coal Limited (BCCL) took over Jharia coal mines.

India accounts for the world’s greatest concentration of coal seam fires. Mine area suffers from pollution of air, water and land.

As of 2019, coal production was integrated into the Central Government; for example, the Government owned about 75% of Coal India Limited, which supplied about 84% of India's thermal coal.

India imports coking coal as good quality coking coal deposits suitable for iron and steel production are not available. In the financial year 2021 -22, India imported nearly 57.16 million tons (90%) against the consumption of 63.74 MT. Sponge iron route using noncoking coal is also followed to produce iron and steel which does not depend on coke or natural gas.

Oil and natural gas

India was the third top crude oil consumer globally (4.8% of the world) with 221 Mt  in 2017. India was the second-top net crude oil (including crude oil products) importer of 205.3 Mt in 2019. India has 49.72 lakh (4.972 million) barrels per day (5.1% of the world) crude oil refining capacity which is ranked 4th globally in 2017.

Liquefied petroleum gas

Nearly 1 crore (10.937 million) tons Liquefied Petroleum Gas (LPG) was consumed during April to September 2019 (six months) in the domestic sector mainly for cooking. The number of domestic connections are 274 million (one connection for five people) with a circulation of more than 40 crore (400 million) LPG cylinders whose net aggregate length would form a 2,00,000 km long pipe line which is more than the length of total railway track laid in India. India is second largest consumer of LPG globally. Most of the LPG requirement is imported. Piped city gas supply in India is not yet developed on major scale.

Biomass and charcoal

Biomass is a renewable energy source and its use for energy generation is mostly carbon-neutral fuel. Carbon dioxide is first taken up by plants during photosynthesis, and later released when biomass is burned. Presently, only 20% of house holds in India use biomass and charcoal for cooking purpose as LPG use for cooking purpose is rising rapidly. In addition biomass is also used marginally in commercial cooking, electricity generation, process industries, etc. The total biomass use in India is nearly 177 Mtoe in the year 2013. Substantial surplus crop residue is also burnt in agriculture fields to clear the land for the next crop. Nearly 75 crore (750 million) tons of non edible (by cattle) biomass is available annually in India which can be put to use for higher value addition without CO2 emissions.

Huge quantity of imported coal is being used in pulverised coal-fired power stations. Raw biomass is not suitable for use in the pulverised coal mills as they are difficult to grind into fine powder due to caking problem. However 100% biomass can be fired after torrefaction in the pulverised coal mills for replacing imported coal. Torrefied biomass plants can be integrated with existing pulverised coal-fired power stations using the available hot flue gas as heat source. Cofiring dry biomass up to 20% heat input with coal is also possible directly in pulverised coal-fired power stations without facing caking problem. North west and southern regions can replace imported coal use with biomass where surplus agriculture/crop residue biomass is burnt in the fields causing pollution problems. As traditional use of biomass is being replaced by LPG at a faster pace, biomass burning in agriculture fields would become major source for causing higher level air pollution.

Biogas which is mainly methane/natural gas can also be used for generating protein-rich cattle, poultry and fish feed in villages economically by cultivating Methylococcus capsulatus bacteria culture with tiny land and water foot print. The carbon dioxide gas produced as by product from these plants can be  put to use in cheaper production of algae oil from algae particularly in tropical countries like India which can displace the prime position of crude oil in near future. Union government is implementing many schemes to utilise productively the agro waste or biomass in rural areas to uplift rural economy and job potential.

Biofuel 

India imports 85% of petroleum products with an import cost of $55 billion in 2020-21, India has set a target of blending 20% ethanol in petrol by 2025 resulting in import substitution saving of US$4 billion or ₹30,000 crore and India provides financial assistance for manufacturing ethanol from rice, wheat, barley, corn, sorghum, sugarcane, sugar beet, etc. In 2016, ethanol market penetration had reached 3.3% blend rate.

Electricity

India was the third largest electricity producer in the world with 1,383 TWh generation in FY 2019–2020 and 99.99% of the population having access to power supply. By 2013, India became the world's third largest producer of electricity with 4.8% global share, surpassing Japan and Russia. India ranks 6th globally in hydropower generation during the year 2019.

India has 136 GW (38%) installed capacity of renewable energy. It is one of the world leaders in renewable energy investments and installations.

India has set a target of 175 gigawatts (GW) of renewable energy capacity by 2022. This would include 100 GW capacity from solar energy sources, 60 GW from wind power, 10 GW from biopower, and 5 GW from small hydropower.

See also

Climate change in India
Electricity sector in India
Energy policy of India
Hydroelectric power in India
Renewable energy in India
Wind power in India
Solar power in India
Nuclear power in India
World energy supply and consumption
List of countries by total primary energy consumption and production
List of countries by oil consumption
List of countries by natural gas consumption
List of countries by coal production
List of countries by electricity production
List of countries by electricity consumption

References